The Miss America 2022 competition was held on December 17, 2021. This was the 94th Miss America competition and was held at the Mohegan Sun in Uncasville, Connecticut, as the Miss America Organization celebrated its 100th anniversary. It was the first Miss America since 1954 that was not televised, but it was streamed on Peacock. There were several technical glitches within the stream throughout the show, causing many viewers to complain on social media about the production value. 

Miss America 2020, Camille Schrier of Virginia crowned her successor, Emma Broyles of Alaska, at the end of the event. Broyles is Alaska's first Miss America title in the history of the pageant and the third Asian American to win the Miss America title, following Angela Perez Baraquio in 2001 and Nina Davuluri in 2014 and the first of Korean descent to win the Miss America title.

Background
On April 8, 2021, the Miss America Organization announced a three-year contract with Mohegan Sun to host the national competition which would be held in December.

On November 22, 2021, it was announced that the competition would be exclusively streamed on Peacock.

Impact of the COVID-19 pandemic

The COVID-19 pandemic affected the planning of the 2021 event, known as Miss America 2021, which was initially scheduled for December 2020 and was to be hosted at the pageant's headquarters in Atlantic City, New Jersey. That was set to air on NBC but was cancelled on May 8, 2020, due to the onset of the pandemic. The other missing years are because there was no pageant held from 1928 to 1932 or in 1934 because of the Great Depression. Miss America Organization opted to postpone the 94th edition or the 100th anniversary of the pageant to the latter part of 2021.

The state pageant competitions had been planned for April to June 2020. However, they were postponed for a year, rescheduled for April and July 2021 or cancelled outright. The pageant allowed a one-time only grandfather clause on eligibility for state qualifying pageants. The exception was Montana, which held its pageant as planned on July 25, 2020. As with restrictions implemented in all 50 states (including Montana) and District of Columbia, numerous health and safety guidelines have been implemented for contestants, production members, and audiences at state pageants, such as taking a negative COVID-19 test and following social distancing. Additionally, a number of state pageants have had to alter their initial venue choices due to shut-downs implemented by their governors. Some state pageants had to push further a month after they were originally intended to schedule in typical April to June schedule to avoid scheduling conflicts with the Miss USA 2021 state pageants, which were rescheduled into most of 2021 due to the pandemic.

On December 13, 2021, Miss Maine Mariah Larocque tested positive for COVID-19, despite being fully vaccinated, and had to withdraw for the remainder of the competition including the final show. As a result, 50 delegates were still able to participate in the final competition as planned.

Overview

Judges

Preliminary Judges 
On December 12-13, 2021, the judges for the preliminary competition selected the preliminary winners as well as the finalists for the final night. The panel included co-founder and president of BossBabe, Danielle Canty; performing artist, Kevin Davis; founder and CEO of Rae Model & Talent Agency, LLC, Jessica Rae; fashion designer, Paige Mycoskie; and artist and singer-songwriter, John Gurney.

Final Night Judges 
On December 15, the judges for the final competition were announced. For the 100th anniversary, the panel consisted of former Miss Americas. They were Miss America 1990, Debbye Turner Bell; Miss America 2000, Heather French Henry; and Miss America 2009, Katie Stam Irk.

Results

Placements

Order of announcements

Top 10

Top 5

Preliminary awards

Equity and Justice Scholarship awards

Forever Miss America Scholarship

Jean Bartel Military Awareness Scholarship

Jean Bartel Social Impact Initiative Scholarship

South Dakota University STEM Scholarship

STEM Scholarship

Top Fundraisers

Women in Business Scholarship

Other awards

Candidates 
All 51 state titleholders have been crowned.

Notes

References

2022
2021 beauty pageants
Events postponed due to the COVID-19 pandemic
December 2021 events in the United States
2021 in Connecticut